Clark Glacier is a glacier between Mount Theseus and Mount Allen, occupying a low pass in the eastern part of the Olympus Range in Victoria Land. It was named by the Victoria University of Wellington Antarctic Expedition, 1958–59, for Professor Robin Clark, head of the Geology Department at the university, who was immediately responsible for the sponsoring of the expedition.

See also
Artemis Ridge

References
 

Glaciers of McMurdo Dry Valleys